Saint-Benoît-des-Ondes is a commune in the Ille-et-Vilaine Department in Brittany in northwestern France.

Population
Inhabitants of Saint-Benoît-des-Ondes are called bénédictins in French.

See also
Communes of the Ille-et-Vilaine department

References

External links

Official website 
Mayors of Ille-et-Vilaine Association 

Communes of Ille-et-Vilaine